The Conway Hall Ethical Society, formerly the South Place Ethical Society, based in London at Conway Hall, is thought to be the oldest surviving freethought organisation in the world and is the only remaining ethical society in the United Kingdom. It now advocates secular humanism and is a member of Humanists International.

History

The Society's origins trace back to 1787, as a nonconformist congregation, led by Elhanan Winchester, rebelling against the doctrine of eternal damnation. The congregation, known as the Philadelphians or Universalists, secured their first home at Parliament Court Chapel on the eastern edge of London on 14 February 1793.

William Johnson Fox became minister of the congregation in 1817. By 1821 Fox's congregation had decided to build a new place of worship, and issued a call for "subscriptions for a new Unitarian chapel, South Place, Finsbury". Subscribers (donors) included businessman and patron of the arts Elhanan Bicknell. In 1824 the congregation built a chapel at South Place, in the Finsbury district of central London. The chapel was repaired by John Wallen, of a family of London architects and builders. This chapel later became the home of South Place Ethical Society.

In 1929 they built new premises, Conway Hall, at 37 (now numbered 25) Red Lion Square, in nearby Bloomsbury, on the site of a tenement, previously a factory belonging to James Perry, a pen and ink maker. Conway Hall is named after an American, Moncure D. Conway, who led the Society from 1864 to 1885 and from 1892 to 1897, during which time it moved further away from Unitarianism. Conway spent the break in his tenure in the United States, writing a biography of Thomas Paine. In 1888 the name of the Society was changed from South Place Religious Society to South Place Ethical Society (SPES) under Stanton Coit's leadership. In 1950 the SPES joined the Ethical Union. In 1969 another name change was mooted, to The South Place Humanist Society, a discussion that sociologist Colin Campbell suggests symbolized the death of the ethical movement in England.

The original name, South Place Ethical Society, was retained until 2012, when it changed to Conway Hall Ethical Society. In November 2013 Elizabeth Lutgendorff was elected Chair of the Conway Hall General Committee, becoming the youngest Chair in the society's history. On 1 August 2014 the society became a Charitable Incorporated Organisation with a new charitable object: "The advancement of study, research and education in humanist ethical principles". This replaced the previous object: "The study and dissemination of ethical principles and the cultivation of a rational religious sentiment."

Conway Hall

Conway Hall was designed by Frederick Mansford, being built on an L-shaped strip of land which the Society had acquired between Theobald's Road and Lamb's Conduit Passage. It is a Grade II listed building built in 1929 and was Mansford's largest project. The main entrance is located on an angle with a narrow arch rising to the top of the upper floor. The arch is flanked by two columns in silver-grey brick while the rest of the building is varied with red-brick detailing. There is a lot of glass in the façade, with wide windows to the Library on the upper level and in and above the entrance doors. The glazing bars form a distinctive tiny criss-cross pattern reflected in Conway Hall's logo. The general feel is that of the Royal Shakespeare Theatre at Stratford-upon-Avon, the old Shakespeare Memorial Theatre. Mansford was aware that his design could appear incoherent and tried to make the elevation hang together by placing six stone urns, bought from a City bank, along roof level, two of them on top of the entrance columns.

The main auditorium can hold 300 plus 180 in a gallery, and in recent years has been used as a corporate events space for conferences and product launches. The use of wooden panelling nailed directly to the brickwork and of acoustic plaster gives the hall excellent acoustic qualities; this makes it very suitable for the performance of music, and there have been regular recordings and concerts there. The ceiling of the auditorium was glazed, and this made it very light and airy for the time. It opened in 1929 and has continued in use since.

Above the proscenium arch the words "To Thine Own Self Be True" (quoting Polonius in Shakespeare's Hamlet) can be seen. These words were originally inscribed on the back wall of the red mahogany panel at the original South Place Chapel.

Film location
The hall has been used as a location for various film and television productions. The building has appeared in Mr Holmes, Bodyguard and Hereafter.

Humanist ceremonies
In 1935 twenty members of the Society signed a document stating that Conway Hall was their regular place of worship. It was therefore certified for marriages by the Registrar-General until 1977 when the Deputy Registrar-General ruled that the Hall could not be used for weddings under the terms of the Places of Worship Registration Act. This followed the report in the winter of 1975 of a marriage solemnised at Conway Hall. He was probably influenced by the 1970 ruling of Lord Denning, that marriages could only be solemnised in places whose principal use is for the "worship of God or [to do] reverence to a deity. Until the ruling the Society had an established tradition of performing secular funerals, memorial ceremonies and namings of children at Conway Hall.

Sunday Concerts 
The Sunday Concerts at Conway Hall can be traced back to 1878 when the Peoples Concert Society was formed for the purpose of "increasing the popularity of good music by means of cheap concerts". Many of these concerts were held at the South Place Institute, but in 1887 the Peoples Concert Society had to cut short its season through lack of funds. At that point the South Place Ethical Society undertook the task of organising concerts under the first Honorary Secretary Alfred J. Clements and Assistant Secretary George Hutchinson who continued to run them under the name 'South Place Sunday Concerts'. The thousandth concert was played on 20 February 1927, and the two-thousandth concert was held at the Queen Elizabeth Hall on 9 March 1969. Clements was the Honorary Secretary for over 50 years, from 1887 to 1938. The Clements Memorial Prize for chamber music was set up in his name in 1938. Composer Richard Henry Walthew also had a long association with the Sunday Concerts, from the early 1900s until his death in 1951.

The concert series provided a rare platform for the work of women composers during its first few decades. The programming included a still small, but significant number of compositions by women compared to other concerts in London. Women composers featured in the first 1,000 concerts included Alice Verne-Bredt, sisters Amy, Annie and Jessie Grimson, Liza Lehmann, Ethel Smyth, Edith Swepstone, Josephine Troup and Maude Valérie White.

In 1929 the South Place Ethical Society had the Conway Hall purpose built for it, and with the exception of the war years the concert seasons have continued. The concerts have now been organised by the Artistic Director, Simon Callaghan.

Hawkins Catalogue
Frank A. Hawkins served as Treasurer of the Sunday Concerts for 24 years from 1905 until his death in June 1929. He collected nearly 2,000 pieces of sheet music of principally classical and romantic chamber music, which were bequeathed to the Society. The collection has been catalogued by composer and instrument combination and is held on the Conway Hall premises.

Conway Memorial Lecture 
The Conway Memorial Lecture was inaugurated by the Society in 1910 to honour Moncure Conway who died in 1907. The decision to create the Lecture was made in 1908 and the first Lecture, The Task of Rationalism, was given by John Russell and is presumed to have been chaired by Edward Clodd.

Prominent lecturers have included Bertrand Russell, Lancelot Hogben, Stanton Coit, Joseph Needham, Edward John Thompson (1942), Jacob Bronowski, Fred Hoyle,  Edmund Leach, Margaret Knight, Christopher Hill (1989), Gilbert Murray (1915), Hermann Bondi (1992), Harold Blackham, Laurens van der Post, Alex Comfort (1990), Fenner Brockway, Jonathan Miller, David Starkey, Bernard Crick, AC Grayling and Roger Penrose.

No Lectures took place in 1958, 1959, 1961, 1962, 1963, 1964, 1965, or 1966.

The 2014 Conway Memorial Lecture was given by Professor Lisa Jardine on 26 June 2014. It was titled "Things I Never Knew About My Father" and detailed the MI5 files kept on her father, Jacob Bronowski, who sixty years earlier had delivered that year's Conway Memorial Lecture.

Library 

The Humanist Library and Archives based at Conway Hall is the UK's foremost resource of its kind in Europe and the only library in the UK solely dedicated to the collection of Humanist material.

Prominent members (past and present) 

 Annie Besant
 Harold Blackham
 Fenner Brockway
 C. Delisle Burns
 Herbert Burrows
 Peter Cadogan
 Alfred J. Clements 
 Stanton Coit
 Moncure Conway
 Andrew Copson
 George Hutchinson
 Naomi Lewis
 Elizabeth Lutgendorff
 James O'Malley
 Samuel Kerkham Ratcliffe, regular lecturer 1910s–1930s
 J. M. Robertson
 Sid Rodrigues
 Donald Rooum
 Athene Seyler
 Barbara Smoker
 Harry Snell
 Reginald Sorensen
 Dr Harry Stopes-Roe
 Nicolas Walter
 Richard Henry Walthew
 Elhanan Winchester

Other notable people associated with the Society 
Charles Bradlaugh, founder of the National Secular Society, and his daughter Hypatia Bradlaugh Bonner
Sophia Dobson Collet, who contributed hymns; her brothers Charles, the Society's musical director, and Collet Dobson Collet
Eliza Flower and her sister Sarah Fuller Flower Adams, who contributed hymns
Peter Fribbins, C20 director of Sunday concerts formerly held at Conway Hall
Philip Harwood, assistant minister to Fox in 1841
Gerald Heard, lecturer from 1927
James Hemming, in whose name the Society administers an annual prize since 2009
Laurence Housman, C20 pacifist and socialist
Harriet Law, C19 freethinker
Harry Price, C20 psychic researcher, born on the site
John Pye-Smith, C19 theologian, tutor to Fox
Rosemary Rapaport, who launched what would become the Purcell School at the Hall in 1962
Archibald Robertson, popular lecturer 1945–60
Samuel Sharpe, who joined South Place Chapel in 1821
Timothy West, C20 actor
Anna Wheeler, 1820s speaker on women's rights

Journal 

The journal of the society, which records its proceedings, is the Ethical Record.  The issue shown for December 2012 was volume 117, number 11. This edition outlines the procedure that took place for the historic change of name the previous month.

Sunday Assembly 
Since 2014, Conway Hall has been host to the Sunday Assembly, a popular secular service which takes place on the first and third Sunday of every month.

See also
Humanists UK
Ethical Movement
International Humanist and Ethical Union
National Secular Society
Rationalist Association
Sea of Faith

References

Sources

Conway, Moncure Daniel. Centenary History of the South Place Society: based on four discourses given in the chapel in May and June, 1893. London/Edinburgh: Williams and Norgate, 1894
MacKillop, Ian (1986). The British Ethical Societies. Cambridge: Cambridge University Press.

External links

Conway Hall Ethical Society
The Ethical Record Online
Conway Memorial Lectures with texts

Humanist associations
Ethical movement
Freethought organizations
Organizations established in 1793
Secular humanism
Charities based in London
Skeptic organisations in the United Kingdom